Calephelis is a genus of butterflies in the family Riodinidae. They are resident in the Americas. There are 43 species in the Neotropical realm and 11 species in the Nearctic.

Larva host plants
Species of Calephelis feed on Asteraceae, Ranunculaceae, Euphorbiaceae and Bromeliaceae. Recorded larval host plants are in the genera Packera, Parthenium, Mikania, Cirsium, Baccharis, Clematis, Encelia, Eupatorium, Ageratina, Bebbia, Acalypha, Bromelia, Chromolaena, Calea, Fleischmannia and Verbesina.

Species list 
 Calephelis acapulcoensis McAlpine, 1971 Mexico
 Calephelis argyrodines (Bates, 1866) Mexico, Guatemala, Costa Rica
 Calephelis arizonensis McAlpine, 1971 Arizona
 Calephelis aymaran McAlpine, 1971 Bolivia, Peru, Chile, Paraguay, Argentina, Brazil
 Calephelis azteca McAlpine, 1971 Mexico
 Calephelis bajaensis McAlpine, 1971 Baja California
 Calephelis borealis (Grote & Robinson, 1866) New York, New Jersey, Virginia, Kentucky, Ohio, Indiana, Missouri
 Calephelis braziliensis McAlpine, 1971 Brazil
 Calephelis browni McAlpine, 1971 Guatemala, Costa Rica, Panama, Nicaragua, Honduras, Salvador
 Calephelis burgeri McAlpine, 1971 Colombia
 Calephelis candiope (Druce, 1904) Colombia
 Calephelis clenchi McAlpine, 1971 Guatemala
 Calephelis costaricola Strand, 1916 Mexico, Honduras, Panama
 Calephelis dreisbachi McAlpine, 1971 Arizona, Mexico
 Calephelis exiguus Austin, 1993 Costa Rica
 Calephelis freemani McAlpine, 1971 Texas
 Calephelis fulmen Stichel, 1910 Mexico to Panama
 Calephelis guatemala McAlpine, 1971 Guatemala
 Calephelis huasteca McAlpine, 1971 Mexico
 Calephelis inca McAlpine, 1971 Costa Rica to Brazil
 Calephelis iris (Staudinger, 1876) Panama, Costa Rica, Guatemala, Colombia
 Calephelis laverna (Godman & Salvin, [1886]) Mexico, Panama, Costa Rica, Trinidad, Colombia, Ecuador, Venezuela, northern Brazil
 Calephelis matheri McAlpine, 1971 Mexico
 Calephelis maya McAlpine, 1971 Mexico
 Calephelis mexicana McAlpine, 1971 Mexico
 Calephelis montezuma McAlpine, 1971 Mexico
 Calephelis muticum McAlpine, 1937 Pennsylvania, Great Lakes states, Minnesota
 Calephelis nemesis (Edwards, 1871) New Mexico, Arizona, Texas, California
 Calephelis nilus (C. & R. Felder, 1861) Venezuela
 Calephelis perditalis Barnes & McDunnough, 1918 Arizona, Texas, Mexico, Central America, Venezuela
 Calephelis rawsoni McAlpine, 1939 Arizona, Texas, Mexico
 Calephelis sacapulas McAlpine, 1971 Guatemala
 Calephelis schausi McAlpine, 1971 Honduras, Panama
 Calephelis sinaloensis McAlpine, 1971 Mexico
 Calephelis sixola McAlpine, 1971 Costa Rica, Panama
 Calephelis sodalis Austin, 1993 Costa Rica, Panama
 Calephelis stallingsi McAlpine, 1971 Mexico, British Honduras, Guatemala
 Calephelis tikal Austin, 1993 Guatemala
 Calephelis tapuyo McAlpine, 1971 Orosi, Brazil
 Calephelis velutina (Godman & Salvin, 1878) Mexico - Columbia
 Calephelis virginiensis (Guérin-Méneville, 1831) Virginia, Florida, Texas, Arkansas
 Calephelis wellingi McAlpine, 1971 Mexico, Guatemala
 Calephelis wrighti Holland, 1930 California, Arizona, Texas, Mexico
 Calephelis yautepequensis R. G. Maza & Turrent, 1977 Mexico
 Calephelis yucatana McAlpine, 1971 Mexico

References 

 Calephelis

External links
Images representing Calephelis at Consortium for the Barcode of Life
Images representing Calephelis at Encyclopedia of Life 441 photos

Riodinidae
Butterfly genera
Taxa named by Augustus Radcliffe Grote